Punk in Drublic is the fifth studio album by the American punk rock band NOFX. It was released on July 19, 1994, through Epitaph Records. The title is a spoonerism of "Drunk in Public".

Punk in Drublic is NOFX's most successful album to date, peaking at number 12 on Billboard'''s Heatseekers chart. The album has received positive reviews and is now considered a classic punk album by fans and critics alike. Six years after its release, it became the band's only gold record for sales of over 500,000 copies in the United States. Worldwide, the record has sold over 1 million copies.

Reception and legacy

The AllMusic review by Stephen Thomas Erlewine awards the album 4.5 stars and states: "The quartet didn't change their approach at all — at their core, they remain a heavy, speed-addled, hook-conscious post-hardcore punk group — but their songwriting has improved, as has their attack."

Accolades

* denotes an unordered list

The album was a big influence on Blink-182's Cheshire Cat (1995), Unwritten Law's Oz Factor (1996), Lagwagon's Let's Talk About Feelings (1998), Sum 41's All Killer No Filler (2001) and Anti-Flag's The General Strike (2012).

Track listing

Personnel
 Fat Mike - vocals, bass
 Eric Melvin - guitar
 El Hefe - guitar
 Herb Reath Stinks - drums
 Mark Curry - additional vocals in "Perfect Government"
 Kim Shattuck - additional vocals in "Lori Meyers"
 Chris Dowd - trombone in "Dig"
 Kenny Lyon - additional guitars
 Mr. Rojers - steel drums in "My Heart Is Yearning"
 New Jew Revue - gang vocals in "The Brews"
 Ryan Greene; Fat Mike - producers
 Ryan Greene - mixing, engineer
 Steve Kravac - assistant engineer

Album notes
 The song "Jeff Wears Birkenstocks" was written about Jeff Abarta an Epitaph Records employee. In 2017, the Birkenstock company produced a short-form documentary about how the song came together that includes new interviews on the subject with Jeff and Fat Mike. Jeff later founded a band called Punk Is Dead that performs punk rock covers of Grateful Dead songs, and currently plays bass in Total Massacre as "Jeff Massacre."
 "Linoleum" is referenced in the Pilot episode of One Tree Hill, when protagonist Lucas Scott notices a NOFX sticker on one of Peyton Sawyer's folders, he sings the line "that's me inside your head."
 Track 17 contains a hidden track starting at 5:29, after three minutes of silence; guitarist El Hefe performs impressions of cartoon characters, such as Yosemite Sam and Popeye.
 The song "Jeff Wears Birkenstocks?" is included in the EA Sports video game NCAA Football 06.
 The song "Linoleum" was released as DLC for the music video game Guitar Hero World Tour.
 The song "Linoleum" was also featured in the soundtrack for the game Grind Session.
 "Linoleum" is also covered by hardcore-punk band Shai Hulud, Russell and the Wolf Choir, post-third wave ska band Streetlight Manifesto on their 2010 album 99 Songs of Revolution, Bad Astronaut, August Burns Red and Frank Turner
 The song "Lori Meyers" was covered by Aiden as a hidden track on their album Knives.
 The song "Dying Degree" was covered by Evergreen Terrace on their cover album Writer's Block.
 The song "Leave It Alone" references another song, "Bringing In the Sheaves", written in 1874 by Knowles Shaw. It is a popular American gospel song strongly associated with Protestant Christians. Despite this fact, both credited songwriters, Fat Mike and Eric Melvin are Jewish.
 The song "Leave It Alone" was also featured in the soundtrack for the game Watch Dogs 2''.

References
 Citations

Sources

External links
NOFX official website
Epitaph Records
Fat Wreck Chords

Punk in Drublic at YouTube (streamed copy where licensed)

NOFX albums
1994 albums
Epitaph Records albums
Albums produced by Ryan Greene